Shorewood is a place name used in the United States:

 Shorewood, Illinois, a village located in Will County
 Shorewood-Tower Hills-Harbert, Michigan, a census-designated place
 Shorewood, Minnesota, a city located in Hennepin County
 Shorewood, Wisconsin, a village located in Milwaukee County

See also
 Shorewood Forest, Indiana, a census-designated place